Lina Gjorcheska (born 3 August 1994) is a Macedonian tennis player, and the most successful of her country to date.

She has career-high WTA rankings of 170 in singles and 116 in doubles, both achieved on 12 June 2017. She has won 12 singles and 45 doubles titles on the ITF Women's Circuit.

Playing for North Macedonia in Fed Cup, Gjorcheska has a win–loss record of 14–4.
At the 2016 US Open, she lost in the first round of qualifying to Catherine Bellis. It was her first Grand Slam appearance.

At her first appearance at the Australian Open in 2017, Gjorcheska beat Sachia Vickery in the first round of qualifications. In the second round, she beat Dalma Gálfi in straight sets and then lost to Stefanie Vögele in three. She played her first WTA Tour main draw at the 2017 Ladies Open Biel Bienne, and lost in the first round to Markéta Vondroušová.
Then she made the finals at the Tunis $60k tournament where she was defeated by Richèl Hogenkamp. She was recovering from right hand injury from August 2017 till April 2018 when she started to play again. Since then, she has been playing tournaments and is slowly climbing on the rankings again. She has been making a successful comeback in singles and doubles in 2019, 2020, and 2021.

Grand Slam singles performance timeline

WTA 125 finals

Doubles: 1 (runner-up)

ITF Circuit finals

Singles: 30 (12 titles, 18 runner–ups)

Doubles: 68 (45 titles, 23 runner–ups)

Fed Cup/Billie Jean King Cup participation

Singles (3–0)

Doubles (2–1)

Notes

References

External links
 
 
 

1994 births
Living people
Macedonian female tennis players
Sportspeople from Tetovo